This page lists prominent, famous, and notable alumni of Reed College, an American institution of liberal arts and sciences, located in Oregon's most populous city, Portland, along with their past and present positions. In addition to famous Reed College graduates, it also includes some famous Reedies who did not graduate.

Alumni

Academia

 Julia Adams – sociologist; professor, Yale University
Jon Appleton, 1961 – composer; Arthur R. Virgin Professor of Music at Dartmouth College, Visiting Professor of Music at Stanford University
Karl W. Aschenbrenner, 1934 – professor, University of California, Berkeley
Louis T. Benezet, 1939 – President, Colorado College
 Sacvan Bercovitch (did not graduate) – Professor of American Literature, Harvard University
 Charles Bigelow, 1967 – Professor of Type Design and Writing, Rochester Institute of Technology
Jonathan Boyarin, 1977 – Mann Professor of Modern Jewish Studies; Professor of Anthropology, Cornell University
 Robert Brenner, 1964 – Professor of History, UCLA
 Joan Bresnan, 1966 – Professor of Linguistics, Stanford University
 Robert A. Brightman, 1973 – Greenberg Professor of Native American Studies, Reed College
 Peter Child, 1975 – composer, professor of music at MIT
 Jessica Coon, 2004 – Linguistics Professor at McGill University
 Galen Cranz, 1966 – Professor of Architecture at the University of California, Berkeley
 Ann Cvetkovich, 1980 – Associate Professor of English at University of Texas, Austin; author of several books, including An Archive of Feelings: Trauma, Sexuality, and Lesbian Public Cultures
 Shannon Lee Dawdy, 1988 – Associate Professor of Anthropology, University of Chicago
Kai T. Erikson, 1953 – President, American Sociological Association and Professor at Yale University
Elizabeth Warnock Fernea, 1950 – anthropologist
Janet Fitch, 1978 – Professor of Professional Writing, University of Southern California
 Neil Fligstein, 1973 – Professor of Sociology, University of California, Berkeley
David H. French, 1939 – anthropologist and linguist
 Victor Friedman, 1970 – Andrew W. Mellon Professor of Balkan and Slavic Linguistics, University of Chicago
 David Grusky, 1980 – Barbara Kimball Browning Professor in the School of Humanities and Sciences at Stanford University
 Peter Gordon, 1988 – Professor of History, Harvard University
 Ted Robert Gurr, 1957 – Professor of Political Science, Northwestern University
 Loyd Haberly, 1919 – Dean, Fairleigh Dickinson University
 Peter Dobkin Hall, 1968 – Hauser Lecturer on nonprofit organizations, Kennedy School of Government at Harvard University
Carol Heimer, 1973 – Professor of Sociology, Northwestern University
 David Hoggan, 1945 – controversial historian
 Dell Hymes, 1950 – anthropologist and linguist
 Maurice Isserman, 1973 – Professor of History, Hamilton College
Lewis Webster Jones, 1921 – President of Rutgers University
 Don Kates, 1962 – criminologist
 Gail M. Kelly, 1955 – anthropologist
Wallace T. MacCaffrey, 1942 – scholar of Elizabethan England; chaired the Harvard University history department twice
Brendan McConville, 1987 – Professor of History at Boston University
 William D. McElroy, 1939 – Chancellor, University of California, San Diego and former Director, National Science Foundation
 Dennis B. McGilvray, 1965 – Professor of Anthropology, University of Colorado
 Lisa Nakamura, 1987 – Professor at the Institute of Communication Research and Asian American Studies at the University of Illinois, Urbana-Champaign
 Kaori O'Connor, 1968 – Senior Research Fellow, University of London
Christopher Phelps, 1988 – Professor of History, University of Nottingham
Ray Raphael, 1965 – historian
 Diane Silvers Ravitch (did not graduate) – Professor of History, New York University; Senior Fellow, Brookings Institution
Barbara Reskin (did not graduate) – Professor of Sociology, University of Washington
Lawrence Rinder, 1983 – Dean of Graduate Studies at the California College of the Arts; former Curator of Contemporary Art at the Whitney Museum
 Stephen Shapin, 1966 – historian and sociologist of science at Harvard University; taught at the University of Edinburgh and the University of California, San Diego
Robert E. Slavin, 1972 – Director of the Center for Research and Reform in Education, Johns Hopkins; cooperative learning, project Success for All
 George Steinmetz (academic), 1980 - Professor of Sociology, University of Michigan
Robert K. Thomas (did not graduate) – Academic Vice President, Brigham Young University
Katherine Verdery, 1970 – Julien J. Studley Faculty Scholar and Distinguished Professor, Anthropology Program, City University of New York Graduate Center
Jon Westling, 1964 – President Emeritus and Professor of History at Boston University
 Richard Wolin, 1974 – Professor at City University of New York Graduate Center

Arts and entertainment
 Jacob Avshalomov, 1941 – composer
 Stella Baker, 2015 – actor
 Kip Berman, 2002 – songwriter and vocalist for The Pains of Being Pure at Heart
 Jody Bleyle, 1992 – singer, songwriter, musician
 Xenia Cage, 1935 – artist and musician
 Jennifer Camper, 1979 – cartoonist
 Peter Child, 1975 – composer, professor of music at MIT
 Ry Cooder, 1971 – singer, songwriter; attended Reed for one semester
 Robert Cornthwaite, 1939 – actor
 Lamar Crowson, 1948 – pianist
 Dr. Demento, born Barret Hansen, 1963 – radio personality
 Pozzi Escot, 1956 – composer
 Johanna Fateman (did not graduate) – musician
 Simone Forti (did not graduate) – choreographer
 Rob Heinsoo, 1987 – game designer
 Matt Keeslar, 2014 - actor
 Hope Lange (did not graduate) – actress
Jayne Loader, 1973 – writer and director; produced and co-directed The Atomic Cafe
 Peter Mars, 1982 – artist
 Robert Morris, 1953 (attended two years) – sculptor
 Bill Morrison, 1985, filmmaker, Guggenheim fellow
 Charles Munch, 1968 – painter
 Daria O'Neill, 1993 – Portland radio and TV personality
 Eric Overmyer, 1973 – screenwriter, producer, playwright
 David Reed, 1968 – artist
 Lawrence Rinder, 1983 – Director of the Berkeley Art Museum
 Brian Rolland (did not graduate) – musician
 Leo Rubinfien, 1974 – photographer
 Susan Silas, 1975 – artist
 Pat Silver-Lasky 1949– screenwriter and actress
 Morgan Spector, 2002 - actor
 Kim Spencer, 1970 – television producer
 David Henry Sterry, 1978 – author, actor/comic
 Igor Vamos, 1990 – contemporary artist, member of The Yes Men
 Anne Washburn, 1991 – playwright (Mr. Burns, A Post-Electric Play)

Business 
 Emilio Pucci, 1937 – fashion designer; member of the Italian Parliament
 Bill Naito, 1949 – Portland businessman, developer, and civic leader
 Robert Friedland, 1974 – businessman and CEO of Ivanhoe Mines
 Suzan DelBene, 1983 – CEO of Nimble Technology and Vice President at Microsoft

Economics 
Dorothy Brady, 1925 – Professor of Economics, University of Pennsylvania
Robert A. Brady, 1923 – Professor of Economics, University of California, Berkeley
Rose Friedman, 1930 – author; wife of Nobel Prize-winning economist Milton Friedman; economist in her own right; left in 1930 after her sophomore year
Mason Gaffney, 1948 – economist and critic of neoclassical economics
John Krutilla, 1949, economist who developed concept of existence value
Kalman J. Cohen, 1951 – Professor of Economics, Duke University
Dale W. Jorgenson, 1955 – economist, professor at Harvard University, past president of the AEA and the Econometric Society
Michael Rothschild, 1963 – economist, Dean of the Woodrow Wilson School at Princeton University
Nicolaus Tideman, 1965 – economist
Yoram Bauman, 1995 – economist and stand-up comedian
Ross Starr (did not graduate) – Professor of Economics, University of California, San Diego
Walter Berns (did not graduate) – Resident Scholar, American Enterprise Institute

Food and Drink 
 James Beard, expelled 1922/23; honorary degree 1976 – chef and cookbook author
 Mark Bitterman, 1995 – food writer and author
 Steven Raichlen, 1975 – television chef, author
 Kate Christensen, 1986 – food writer and author
 Susan Sokol Blosser, 1967 – founder of Sokol Blosser Winery
Sean Thackrey (did not graduate) – winemaker

Government

 Josiah H. Beeman V, 1958 – United States Ambassador to New Zealand
 Bud Clark (did not graduate) – Mayor of Portland
 Richard Danzig, 1965 – 71st Secretary of the Navy
 Suzan DelBene, 1983 – United States Representative from Washington state (D)
 Chris Garrett, 1996 – member of the Oregon Legislature
 Marie Gluesenkamp Perez, United States Representative from Washington state
 Richard L. Hanna, 1973 – United States Representative from New York (R)
 Cordelia Hood, 1936 – Office of Strategic Services and CIA agent
 Mingus Mapps, Portland, Oregon city council member
 Sheldon T. Mills, 1927 – Former United States Ambassador to Afghanistan
 J. Elizabeth Mitchell, 1991 – member of the Maine Legislature
 Norman Solomon (did not graduate) – candidate for the United States House of Representatives
 Howard Wolpe, 1960 – Congressman (D-Michigan)

Law
Hans A. Linde, 1947 – Justice, Oregon Supreme Court
Berkeley Lent, 1948 – Chief Justice, Oregon Supreme Court
George M. Joseph, 1951 – Chief Judge, Oregon Court of Appeals
Michael E. Levine, 1962 – Senior Lecturer at the New York University School of Law; Dean Emeritus of the Yale School of Management
Alex Martinez, 1973 – Chief Justice, Colorado Supreme Court
Jessica Litman, 1974 – Professor of Law at the University of Michigan, legal advisor
Katya Komisaruk, 1978 – civil rights lawyer
Alafair Burke, 1991 – Assistant District Attorney, Multnomah County, Oregon; Professor of Law, Hofstra University; crime and mystery writer
Chris Garrett, 1996 – Justice, Oregon Supreme Court
Gus J. Solomon (did not graduate) – US District Judge, District of Oregon
 Jacob Tanzer (did not graduate) – Justice, Oregon Supreme Court
Fay Stender (did not graduate) – lawyer and prisoners' rights advocate

Literature
 Tamim Ansary, 1970 – author of West of Kabul, East of New York
 Doon Arbus, 1967 – writer and journalist, daughter of Diane Arbus
 Alison Baker, 1975 – writer
 Mary Barnard, 1932 – modernist poet and translator of Greek poet Sappho
 Margaret Bechard, 1976 – science fiction writer
 Don Berry, 1931 – writer
 Mei-mei Berssenbrugge, 1969 – poet
 Lee Blessing, 1971 – playwright
 Hob Broun, 1972, author who became paralyzed and wrote two books by puffing air through a tube.
 Alafair Burke, 1991 – author
 Robert Chesley, 1965 – playwright, novelist, and composer
 Kate Christensen, 1986 – novelist, winner of 2008 PEN/Faulkner Award for Fiction
 Gordon Dahlquist, 1984 – playwright, novelist
 William Dickey, 1951 – poet
 Katherine Dunn, 1969 – journalist and author of Geek Love
 Elana Dykewomon, ca. 1971 – author
 Elyssa East, 1994 – novelist
 David Eddings, 1954 – writer
Nancy Farmer, 1963 – novelist, winner of National Book Award for Young People's Literature
 Elyse Fenton, 2003 – poet
 Janet Fitch, 1978 – novelist, White Oleander, Paint It Black, and The Revolution of Marina M
 Debra M. Ginsberg, 1984 – author
 Shadab Zeest Hashmi, 1995 – poet
 Ernest Haycox (did not graduate) – author
 Myrlin Hermes, 1997 – author
 Roger Hobbs, 2011 – author of Ghostman and Vanishing Games
 Jemiah Jefferson, 1994 – author
 Laleh Khadivi, 1998 – author and writer
 Caroline B. Miller, 1959 – author
 Lisa Dale Norton, 1976 – author
 Steven Raichlen, 1975 – author and writer
 Howard Rheingold, 1968 – writer
 M. C. Richards, 1938 – poet
David Romtvedt, 1972 – poet
 Mary Rosenblum, 1975 – author
 Vern Rutsala, 1956 – poet and writer
 Tina Satter, 2004 – playwright
 Leslie Scalapino, 1966 – poet, publisher, and playwright
 Genny Smith, 1943 – naturalist, activist, publisher
 Gary Snyder, 1951 – Pulitzer Prize winner and poet
 Vanessa Veselka, 2010 – novelist
 Sally Watson, 1950 – writer
 Philip Whalen, 1951 – poet
 Lew Welch, 1950 – poet

Journalism and media 
Ed Cony, 1948 – Editor of The Wall Street Journal, winner of the Pulitzer Prize in 1961
Robert Richter, 1951 – documentary filmmaker and Academy Award winner
Barbara Ehrenreich, 1963 – journalist, political activist, author of Nickel and Dimed
Jim Compton, 1964 – journalist at PBS
Howard Rheingold, 1968 – writer, critic, and virtual media theorist
Sheila Rogers, 1980 – columnist and TV producer for The Late Show With David Letterman
Gary Wolf, 1983 – author and writer for Wired.
Anya Schiffrin, 1984 – business journalist and author of Global Muckraking: 100 Years of Investigative Reporting from Around the World
 Adam L. Penenberg, 1986 – writer, professor of journalism at New York University
 Peter S. Goodman, 1989 – reporter for the New York Times and author of Past Due: The End of Easy Money and the Renewal of the American Economy
 Robert Smith, 1989 — journalist, host of Planet Money.
 Arun Rath, 1994 – correspondent for NPR and WGBH, former weekend host of NPR's All Things Considered
 Michelle Nijhuis, 1996 – journalist
 Peter Zuckerman, 2003 – journalist and author
 Adrian Chen, 2009 – journalist and former staff writer at The New Yorker.

Inventors and Innovators 

 C. Howard Vollum, 1936 – founder of Tektronix; inventor of the edge-triggered oscilloscope
Ken Koe, 1945 – co-inventor of Zoloft.
 Bernard Smith, 1948 – sailboat designer
 John Sperling, 1948 – founder of the University of Phoenix
 James Russell, 1953 – inventor of the compact disc
 Peter Norton, 1965 – creator of Norton Utilities
 Richard Crandall, 1969 – computer scientist who developed the irrational base discrete weighted transform used in finding large prime numbers
 Steve Jobs, 1976 (attended as a freshman, did not graduate) – Apple co-founder and former CEO; Pixar co-founder and former CEO
 Pamela Ronald, 1982 – geneticist and developer of flood-tolerant rice
 Larry Sanger, 1991 – co-founder of Wikipedia
Luke Kanies, 1996 – created Puppet software system

Philosophy 
 Karl Aschenbrenner, 1934 – philosopher of aesthetics
 Sydney Shoemaker, 1953 – Susan Linn Sage Professor of Philosophy at Cornell University
 Guy Sircello, 1958 – Professor of Philosophy, University of California, Irvine and scholar of aesthetics
 Jay Rosenberg, 1963 – Taylor Grandy Professor of Philosophy, University of North Carolina at Chapel Hill
 Allen W. Wood, 1964 – Professor of Philosophy, Indiana University
 Tom Wasow, 1967 – Professor of Linguistics and Philosophy at Stanford University
 Sally Haslanger, 1977 – Professor of Philosophy, MIT
 Eric T. Olson, 1986 – Professor of Philosophy, University of Sheffield; taught at Cambridge University
Lisa Kemmerer, 1988 – author and professor of philosophy and religion at Montana State University Billings

Psychology and Neuroscience 
 Harry Harlow, 1926 (did not graduate) – professor of psychology, University of Wisconsin–Madison
 Herbert Jasper, 1928 – professor of psychology, McGill University
 Eleanor Maccoby, 1939 – psychologist at Stanford University, member of the National Academy of Sciences
 M. Brewster Smith, 1939 (did not graduate) – professor of psychology, University of Chicago
Jeanne Block, 1947 – developmental psychologist, professor, Stanford University
 Richard F. Thompson, 1953 – professor of psychology, University of Southern California
 Daryl Bem, 1960 – professor of psychology, Cornell University
 Eleanor Rosch, 1960 – professor of psychology, University of California, Berkeley
 Robert Frager, 1961 – social psychologist, founder of the Institute of Transpersonal Psychology
Mary Rothbart, 1962 – educational and developmental psychologist, professor at University of Oregon
Eleanor Rosch, 1962 – cognitive psychologist, professor at UC Berkeley
 Paul H. Taghert, 1975 – neuroscientist, Washington University in St. Louis
 Roberto Malinow, 1979 – neuroscientist, UC San Diego
Cyma Van Petten, 1981 – cognitive neuroscientist, professor at SUNY-Binghampton
 Gina G. Turrigiano, 1984 – professor of vision science, Brandeis University; MacArthur Fellow
 Athena Aktipis, 2002 – director of the Human Generosity Project at Arizona State University
 Allen Bergin (did not graduate) – psychologist

Biology and Chemistry 
 James Emory Eckenwalder, 1971 - botanist
 Arthur H. Livermore, 1940 – biochemist
 Allah Verdi Mirza Farman Farmaian, 1951 – biologist, Rutgers University
 Bruce Voeller, 1956 – biologist, AIDS researcher, gay-rights activist; coined the term AIDS
 Daniel S. Kemp, 1958 – Professor of Chemistry, MIT
 Mark Ptashne, 1961 – Professor of Molecular Biology at Memorial Sloan-Kettering Cancer Center
 Donald Engelman, 1962 – biochemist at Yale University; Guggenheim fellow
 Anne Hiltner, 1963 – polymer scientist and professor at Case Western Reserve
 Kenneth Raymond, 1964 – Professor of Chemistry, University of California, Berkeley
 Arlene Blum, 1966 – mountaineer and chemist
 Michael Balls, 1966 – zoologist and professor, University of Nottingham
 Mary Jo Ondrechen, 1974 – Professor of Chemistry and Chemical Biology at Northeastern University
 Alison Butler, 1977 – metallobiochemist at UC Santa Barbara, fellow of the American Academy of Arts and Sciences
 Rachel E. Klevit, 1978 – Professor of Biochemistry, University of Washington
 Roger Perlmutter, 1973 – biotechnologist; head of Research and Development at Amgen, Inc.
 Patricia Quinn, 1982 - Atmospheric Scientist, National Oceanic and Atmospheric Administration, Fellow of the American Geophysical Union; Fellow of the American Academy of Arts and Sciences
 Victor Nizet, 1984 – Professor of Pediatrics and Pharmacy at the University of California, San Diego
 Kevan Shokat, 1986 – Professor and Chair of Cellular and Molecular Pharmacology at University of California, San Francisco; Howard Hughes Medical Institute investigator
 John Alroy, 1989 – paleobiologist
 Stephen C. Sillett, 1989 – botanist, professor at Humboldt State University
 Paul Knoepfler, 1989, stem-cell researcher, author, professor at UC Davis School of Medicine

Science, Mathematics, Computing, and Engineering
John Backus, 1932 – Professor of Physics, University of Southern California
John Alexander Simpson, 1940 – Professor of Physics, University of Chicago, and atomic scientist on the Manhattan Project
Clarence Allen, 1949 – Professor of Geology, California Institute of Technology
Daniel Bump, 1974 - Professor of Mathematics, Stanford University
Larry Shaw, 1961 – physicist and founder of Pi Day
David B. Dusenbery, 1964 – father of sensory ecology
David Flory, 1964 – physicist; Professor of Physics, Chairman of the Physics Department, and Director of the School of Natural Sciences at Fairleigh Dickinson University
Arthur Ogus, 1968 – Professor of Mathematics, University of California, Berkeley
Thomas William Ferguson, 1965 – physician
Alan H. Borning, 1971 – Professor of Computer Science, University of Washington
Jonathan Grudin, 1972 – computer scientist
Mark Galassi, 1987 – physicist and computer scientist, Los Alamos National Laboratory
Marilyn Olmstead, 1965 - chemist, expert in small molecule crystallography
Catherine Otto, 1975 – physician
Daniel Kottke, 1976 – computer scientist
Lawrence Philips, 1976 – software engineer; developer of the Metaphone family of phonetic encoding algorithms
Norman Packard, 1977 – chaos theory physicist
Steven McGeady, 1980 – technologist
Theodore James Courant, 1982 – mathematician
Susan Subak, 1982 – environmental and climate scientist
Kelly Falkner, 1983 – oceanographer, Antarctic researcher
Peter Shirley, 1985, computer scientist
Keith Packard, 1986 – software developer; known for his work on the X Window System
Shep Doeleman, 1986 – astrophysicist, director of the Event Horizon Telescope project
Irena Swanson, 1987, mathematician and professor at Reed College
Craig DeForest, 1989 – astrophysicist, director of the PUNCH mission
Edward Ramberg (did not graduate) – physicist

Other
Greta Christina, 1983 – blogger
 Mike Davis (did not graduate) – activist and scholar
Randall Giles (did not graduate) – composer
Max Gordon, 1924 – owner of the Village Vanguard
 Mukunda Goswami, 1961 – Hare Krishna guru
 Christopher Langan – "America's smartest man;" won a scholarship to Reed after earning a perfect SAT score, but dropped out
 Murray Leaf, 1961 – anthropologist
 Taliesin Myrddin Namkai-Meche, 2016 – human rights activist
Joann Osterud, 1968 – aviator and stunt pilot
Harry Wayland Randall, 1936 – member of international brigades in Spanish Civil War
 Aaron Rhodes, 1971 – human rights advocate
 Helen Sandoz – lesbian activist
 Peter Stafford (did not graduate) – author and writer
Sumner Stone, 1967 – typeface designer
 Michael Teitelbaum, 1966 – program director and demographer at the Alfred P. Sloan Foundation
Donald Niven Wheeler, 1936 – political activist

Fictional alumni
 Erlich Bachmann, from HBO's Silicon Valley
 John William Barry from David Guterson's 2008 novel The Other
 Bill McKay, portrayed by Robert Redford in the 1972 film The Candidate
 Donald "Don" Miller in his semi-autobiographical 2003 book Blue Like Jazz and (portrayed by Marshall Allman) in the 2012 Blue Like Jazz film
 Harald Petersen, Reed '27 from Mary McCarthy's 1963 novel The Group
 Japhy Ryder from Jack Kerouac's 1958 novel The Dharma Bums (based on Reed alum Gary Snyder)
 Hunter Scangarelo (did not graduate), friend of Meadow Soprano in the 1999–2007 television series The Sopranos
 Sierra from Charmed Thirds, Megan McCafferty's 2006 novel in the Jessica Darling series
 Lambert "Sharkey" Somers, from Judy Blume's 1998 novel Summer Sisters

Faculty
 William J. Connell – historian
 Paul Douglas – US Senator from Illinois
 David J. Griffiths – physicist
 Daniel Reisberg – psychology

Administration
 Paul Bragdon – college president from 1971 to 1988

References

 
Reed College alumni
Reed College people
Reed College people